Insomniacks is a Malaysian pop band from Kuala Lumpur. They rose to prominence with the release of their second single, "Pulang", in 2018, which charted on the Malaysian RIM streaming charts for 146 consecutive weeks, and a total of 185 weeks as of July 2022.

The group have cited 5 Seconds of Summer, Fall Out Boy, Day6, Mayday Parade and Paramore as influences.

Career

History and formation 
The band began as Dan's Band with Danial and Iqbal who were classmates at SMK St. John. Gavin joined as the drummer after being recommended to the duo by Iskandar (a schoolmate of Gavin's at Sekolah Sri KDU, and childhood friend of Iqbal's). Iskandar would later go on to join the band as their bassist.

Insomniacks formed in 2015. In November of that year, the quartet would begin posting videos of themselves performing covers of popular songs on their YouTube channel.

2017–present: Debut and mainstream success with "Pulang" 
In 2017, they released their debut single, "Selalu", which was featured as part of the soundtrack of the Astro Ria drama, My Coffee Prince.

In 2018, the group released their second single, "Pulang". The group released the four-episode Pulang WEBisode webseries on their YouTube channel as part of their single promotions. "Pulang" achieved the record for most consecutive weeks on the RIM streaming charts. "Pulang" has been on the RIM Malay singles chart for 185 weeks, as of July 2022.

In 2019, Iqbal co-founded the Klang Valley-based music collective, Distorted (alias Distorted Material), alongside Jessel Phuah (Sino), Ariff Jazmi, Helloluqman of Block J (Jonah), and Nik Qayrel Aiman (Eneyeqay) of the duo Niqie. Iqbal goes by the alias Balo as part of Distorted.

Insomniacks were the fifth most streamed Malaysian artist on Spotify, in 2019.

In 2020, Insomniacks released their third single, "Kepala Batu" ahead of the release of their debut EP of the same name. "Kepala Batu" was composed in collaboration with prolific Malaysian singer-songwriter, Faizal Tahir. The lead single from the EP, "Reminisensi", was the first song Insomniacks wrote as a band.

After four years signed with Sony Music Malaysia, their contract expired in 2020. They consequently signed with Universal Music Malaysia in March 2021. On 14 February 2022, Insomniacks released, "Sempurna". The single peaked at number 1 on the RIM Malay singles streaming chart and number 5 on Billboard's Malaysia Songs chart.

Since March 2022, Gavin has not been participating in "Sempurna" promotions with the band. On 12 June 2022, it was announced in a statement on his and the band's social media that he would be taking an extended hiatus from the band and will not be part of any upcoming projects. 

The band released their first single as a trio, "Igauan Malam", on 4 November 2022.

Members 
Adapted from Hitz:

Active 
 Iqie (Syed Mir Iqbal; born 3 June 1997 in Kuala Lumpur) – lead vocals, guitar
 Iskandar (Wan Arif Iskandar; born 9 September 1997 in Westminster, London) – bass, vocals
 Danial (Danial Doodye; born 25 February 1997 in Kuala Lumpur) – rhythm guitar, vocals

Inactive 
 Gavin (Gavin Wong; born 27 December 1997 in Kuala Lumpur) – drums, cajon, guitar

Discography

Extended plays

Singles

As lead artist

As featured artist

Music videos

Awards and nominations

References 

1997 births
Living people
Musical groups established in 2015
2015 establishments in Malaysia
Malaysian boy bands
Malaysian pop music groups
Malaysian pop rock music groups